The Queensland Greens is a Green party in Queensland, Australia, and a state member of the Australian Greens. The party is currently represented in all three levels of government, by Larissa Waters and Penny Allman-Payne in the federal Senate; Stephen Bates, Max Chandler-Mather, and Elizabeth Watson-Brown in the House of Representatives; Michael Berkman and Amy MacMahon in the state Legislative Assembly; and Jonathan Sriranganathan in Brisbane City Council.

History
The Greens were first founded in Queensland as the Brisbane Green Party in 1984, contesting four wards and for mayor in the 1985 Brisbane City Council elections. Following the collapse of the Brisbane Greens in 1986, the party began to re-form as the Queensland Greens under a national initiative, today's Australian Greens. The Queensland Greens were officially founded as a political party on 22 September 1991 as part of the national Greens alliance.

Federal Parliament 
Queensland Greens co-founder Drew Hutton ran in the 1993, 1998 and 2004 federal elections as the party's lead Senate candidate. In 2004 the party received 5.4 per cent of the Senate vote, with Hutton narrowly losing the race for the final two Senate seats to Coalition candidates Barnaby Joyce and Russell Trood. This gave the Howard government a Senate majority and control of both parliamentary houses.

The party's Senate vote continued to grow in subsequent elections, reaching a high-water mark of 12.76 per cent at the 2010 federal election, which resulted in Larissa Waters becoming the first Greens representative elected to office in Queensland. Waters was re-elected to a three-year term in the 2016 election, but resigned in 2017 after discovering she held dual Canadian citizenship. The High Court ruled that her election was therefore invalid, and appointed Andrew Bartlett, convenor of the Queensland Greens and former leader of the Australian Democrats, as her successor in the Senate. A year later, Bartlett resigned his Senate seat to run for the lower house seat of Brisbane, allowing Waters to return as a Senator. While Waters was successfully re-elected to the Senate in the 2019 election, Bartlett was unsuccessful in Brisbane, despite gaining a 3 per cent swing towards him.

The 2022 election was a major success for the Queensland Greens, as they went from having no federal lower house representatives to three, with Max Chandler-Mather winning in Griffith, Elizabeth Watson-Brown in Ryan, and Stephen Bates in Brisbane. In addition, Waters was joined by a second Queensland Greens Senator, Penny Allman-Payne. This string of victories was dubbed a "Greenslide" by federal party leader Adam Bandt, while some media commentators nicknamed the state "Greensland" in their coverage of the results.

Queensland Parliament
The Queensland Greens have received steadily increasing support in state elections, increasing their vote from 2.5 per cent at the 2001 election to 9 per cent in the 2020 election.

The party gained its first state parliamentary representative in 2008 when the Member for Indooroopilly, Ronan Lee, defected to the Greens from the Labor Party. Lee ascribed his move to the Greens to his dissatisfaction with the Bligh government's environmental policies. Responding to Lee's change of party, Labor's Minister for Climate Change and Sustainability Andrew McNamara rejected his claims, calling the Bligh government "the greenest government that this state has ever had". Australian Greens leader Bob Brown praised Lee's decision saying, "Ronan Lee's move will give the Queensland Parliament a strong and intelligent Greens advocate to lead debate on the best social and economic way forward in an age of environmental and economic crisis... Now there will be a responsible voice free to challenge those old Labor and National-Liberal policies which, for example threaten the death of the Great Barrier Reef and tens of thousands of jobs dependent on it within a generation". However, Lee lost his seat to LNP candidate Scott Emerson at the 2009 election.

In the 2017 state election, the Queensland Greens achieved their first ever state electoral victory. Following the abolition of the seats of Mt Coot-tha and Indooroopilly, environmental lawyer Michael Berkman narrowly won the newly-formed seat of Maiwar from the shadow treasurer Scott Emerson, a former cabinet member in the Newman government, who had defeated Ronan Lee in Indooroopilly eight years earlier.

In the 2020 state election, the Greens gained an additional seat in parliament, bringing their total to two. While Berkman retained his seat of Maiwar, Amy MacMahon won the seat of South Brisbane from Labor's former deputy premier Jackie Trad. The Greens also had significant success in Cooper, with candidate Katinka Winston-Allom receiving 30 per cent of first preference votes, but losing to Labor's Jonty Bush after preferences were allocated.

Local governments 
Greens candidate Jonathan Sriranganathan (then known as Sri) was elected to represent The Gabba Ward in Brisbane City Council at the March 2016 local government elections. He achieved a primary vote of 31.72%, a positive swing of approximately 13.8%. Sriranganathan finished in second place behind LNP candidate Sean Jacobs, but was able to win on mostly Labor preferences. Sriranganathan is the first Greens candidate to win a seat in local government anywhere in Queensland.

At the 2020 Brisbane City council elections, the Greens were the only party to have a swing in their favour, at 3.3%. Jonathan Sriranganathan retained his ward with a 12.4% swing in primary vote and an overall two-party preferred vote of 65.5%. The Greens additionally entered the two-party preferred vote in 4 other wards where the party came close to unseating the Liberal candidates, including Central (45.2%), Paddington (49.6%), Pullenvale (40.6%) and Walter Taylor (47.7%). 21 out of the 26 wards registered swings towards the Greens.

Queensland Young Greens 

The Queensland Young Greens are the youth wing of the Queensland Greens and is open to all members under the age of 31 across the state of Queensland. The Young Greens' main focus is on election campaigning, skills training, policy development, and hosting a number of different social events. The youth wing maintains a grassroots approach in organising members. The youth wing also shares the same policies as the Queensland Greens based around the four guiding principles of non-violence, social justice, grass-roots democracy and ecological sustainability.

Electoral history

Queensland

Federal

Parliamentarians

Federal Parliament

House of Representatives

Current

Senate

Current

Former

State Parliament

Current

Former

Councillors

Brisbane City Council

Current

References

Australian Greens by state
Political parties in Queensland
1991 establishments in Australia
Political parties established in 1991